Bharatha Vilas is a 1973 Indian Tamil-language film co-written and directed by A. C. Tirulokchandar. It stars Sivaji Ganesan and K. R. Vijaya. The film features an ensemble cast, with prominent actors from other languages playing guest roles in a song. It was released on 24 March 1973.

Plot 
Gopal and Gowri are salespeople in competing organisations. They are professional rivals and end up sharing rooms in the same house belonging to an Englishman. Naidu and his Kannada wife are caretakers of the house where they both stay. In due course, Gopal and Gowri get married and quit their jobs on the same day. Naidu and his wife lend them some money to start a business. Gopal's business becomes successful. Gowri and Gopal, who have a son, are about to have another baby.

A Punjabi family led by Baldev Singh move into one of the portions. A Malayalee Muslim led by Ibrahim family take up residence in other part of the same house. After some initial hiccups, the four families settle down and become close friends. Gopal's secretary Kalaivani tries to entice him and her cunning brother takes a photo of the two of them together. He begins to blackmail Gopal, whose neighbours help him fight the blackmailer off, thus sealing the bond between the families even more strongly. When the house owner decides to sell the house and return to England, the families buy the house together with Gopal paying Naidu's share. They call the house Bharatha Vilas, since it houses people from all parts of the country.

The movie fast-forwards to a few years later, which sees Gopal successful and slightly arrogant about his wealth. His grown-up daughter is very close to Ibrahim's family and she considers Ibrahim's son Hamid as her brother. After receiving an anonymous letter implying wrongly that they are in a relationship, an irate Gopal cuts off all contact with Ibrahim and fixes his daughter's wedding with one of his relatives.

Ibrahim kicks Hamid out of the house, and Hamid joins the army, which is to go to war. He is killed in the war and a letter he wrote before he left for battle makes it clear to Gopal that his daughter and him were just like siblings. Gopal and Ibrahim reconcile. Meanwhile, Gopal's son and Baldev Singh's daughter – who are both medical students – are in love without their parent's knowledge.  Gopal suddenly suffers a huge loss in business and is unable to pay the dowry for his daughter. When the groom's family pressures him, his neighbours offer to contribute towards the dowry. Gopal is humbled by their generosity, and he requests Naidu to have his son marry his daughter. Naidu agrees on the condition that Gopal gets his son married to Baldev Singh's daughter. The neighbours finally become one large happy family.

Cast 
 Sivaji Ganesan as Gopal
 K. R. Vijaya as Gowri
 Major Sundarrajan as Baldev Singh
 Devika as Gulabhi
 V. K. Ramasamy as Ibrahim Bhai
 Rajasulochana as Sameer
 M. R. R. Vasu as Narasimma Naidu
 Manorama as Meera Bai
 Sivakumar as Shankar
 Jayasudha as Mohini
 Jayachitra as Sundari
 Sasikumar as Ameer
 Jayachandran as Narasimma Naidu's son
S. V. Ramadas as Gilbert
J. P. Chandrababu as Doctor
'Baby' Sridevi as young Sundari
Senthamarai as Ramamoorthy
A. Sakunthala as Kalaivani
Rajapandiyan as Blackmailer
Comedy Shanmugan as Punnakku kadai Punniyakodi
Karuppu Subbiah as Savuri kadai Chellamuthu
Akkineni Nageswara Rao as a Telugu actor (Guest appearance)
 Sanjeev Kumar as a Hindi actor (Guest appearance)
 Madhu as a Malayalam actor (Guest appearance)

Themes 
Bharatha Vilas revolves around the themes of "religious unity, secularism, and brotherhood".

Soundtrack 
The music was composed by M. S. Viswanathan, with lyrics by Vaali. The song "Indhiya Naadu" had "lyrics that stressed on the importance of sharing river waters and the significance of national integration".

Reception 
Kanthan of Kalki appreciated Tirulokchandar's direction and Thirumaran's dialogues. Bharatha Vilas won the Filmfare Award for Best Film – Tamil, and Tirulokchandar won for Best Director – Tamil.

References

External links 
 

1970s Tamil-language films
1973 films
Films directed by A. C. Tirulokchandar
Films scored by M. S. Viswanathan